Khezha or Kuzha, is a major language of the Chakhesang Naga ethnic group of Phek District in the southern part of Nagaland, India. It is generally spoken by the Khezha people and is one of the three major languages of the Chakhesang Nagas. Khezha or Kuzhale is predominantly spoken in Pfütsero and Chizami region of Phek District. It is also spoken by few villages in the northern part of Ukhrul District in the state of Manipur.

Further reading
Kapfo, Kedutso. 1993. A Descriptive Analysis of Khezha. University of Mysore. (Doctoral dissertation); 
Kapfo, Kedutso. 2004. The Ethnology of the Khezhas and Khezha grammar. Mysore: Central Institute of Indian Languages.

External links
Audio sample of Khezha

References

Languages of Nagaland
Angami–Pochuri languages
Endangered languages of India